The Montreux Volley Masters (founded as the Coupe des Nations, later changed to BCV Volley Cup between 1990 and 1996 and to its current name in 1998) is an international invitational tournament for national teams in women's volleyball hosted by the Swiss Volley. Held annually in Montreux, Switzerland since 1984, it is the tournament that opens the international season for national teams.

The main objective of this competition is to work as a preparation for more important and prestigious volleyball tournaments organized by the Fédération Internationale de Volleyball (FIVB), such as the World Grand Prix, the World Championship, the World Cup and the Olympic Games. Many national teams use the tournament as a way of giving experience and international baggage to young players and, as a result, countries are often represented by their underage national teams.

Results

Medal summary

MVP by edition
1984-2006 – Unknown
2007 – 
2008 – 
2009 – 
2010 – 
2011 – 
2013 – 
2014 – 
2015 – 
2016 – 
2017 – 
2018 – 
2019 –

All-time team records

(Based on W=2 pts and D=1 pts)

Notes

External links

 
International volleyball competitions hosted by Switzerland
Women's volleyball competitions in Switzerland
International women's volleyball competitions
Sport in Montreux
Recurring sporting events established in 1984
1984 establishments in Switzerland
Annual sporting events